Microporus is a genus of fungi in the family Polyporaceae. The genus has a widespread distribution and, according to a 2008 estimate, contains 11 species.

Species
, Index Fungorum accepts 12 species in Microporus:
M. affinis (Blume & T.Nees) Kuntze (1898)
M. affinis-microloma (Lloyd) T.Hatt. & Sotome (2013)
M. atroalbus (Henn.) Kuntze (1898)
M. atrovillosus Ryvarden (1975)
M. concinnus P.Beauv. (1804)
M. incomptus (Afzel. ex Fr.) Kuntze (1898)
M. internuntius (Corner) T. Hatt. (2005)
M. longisporus T.Hatt. (2000)
M. luteoceraceus D.A.Reid (1986) – Peninsular Malaysia
M. nipponicus (Yasuda) Imazeki (1943)
M. subvernicipes (Murrill) T.Hatt. & Sotome (2013)
M. xanthopus (Fr.) Kuntze (1898)

Chemistry
Seven novel diterpene molecules, microporenic acids A–G, were isolated from the cultures of an undescribed species of Microporus found in the Kakamega Forest of Kenya. These compounds have antimicrobial activity against several Gram-positive bacteria, and also inhibit the formation of biofilm by Staphylococcus aureus.

References

Polyporaceae
Polyporales genera
Fungi described in 1805